Rabanal is a surname. Notable people with the surname include:

Francisco Rabanal (1906–1982), Argentine accountant and politician
Jesús Rabanal (born 1984), Peruvian footballer
Raquel Martínez Rabanal (born 1979), Spanish journalist
Rodolfo Rabanal (1940–2020), Argentine writer and journalist
Rubén Rabanal (1935–1985), Argentine politician
Iker Rabanal , creator of undertime.es